Dove Olivia Cameron (born Chloe Celeste Hosterman; January 15, 1996) is an American singer and actress. She became famous for her double role of the eponymous characters in the Disney Channel comedy series Liv and Maddie, for which she won the Daytime Emmy Award for Outstanding Performer in Children's Programming. Cameron continued her work with the Disney Channel and portrayed Mal in the Descendants franchise (2015–2021). In 2016, Cameron starred in the NBC live television musical Hairspray Live!. On stage, from 2018 to 2019, she played the role of Cher Horowitz in an off-Broadway rendition of the 1995 film Clueless, and in 2019, she debuted on the London stage with her portrayal of Clara Johnson in the musical The Light in the Piazza. Cameron further starred in the comedy thriller Vengeance (2022).

As a singer, Cameron made her debut with the soundtrack album to Liv and Maddie (2015). In the same year, she released her debut single, "If Only", which was included in the soundtrack album for Descendants, the album topped the US Billboard 200, and was certified gold by the Recording Industry Association of America (RIAA), she also participated in two soundtrack albums for Descendants : Descendants 2, Descendants 3 (2017–2019). Her debut musical release, Bloodshot / Waste, was released in 2019. In 2022, she released the single "Boyfriend", the song received commercial and critical success, and also reached the top 20 in the Billboard Hot 100, and was certified platinum by the RIAA.

She has received various accolades including an American Music Award, an MTV Video Music Award, two Nickelodeon Kids' Choice Award, and a Daytime Emmy Award. She also has a large following on social media, her Instagram has more than 48 million followers, and TikTok has more than 12 million.

Early life
Cameron was born Chloe Celeste Hosterman on January 15, 1996, in Bainbridge Island, Washington to Philip Alan Hosterman and Bonnie Wallace, who later divorced. She has an older sister, Claire Hosterman. During her childhood, Cameron attended Sakai Intermediate School. At age eight, she began acting in community theater at Bainbridge Performing Arts. Six years later, her family moved to Los Angeles, California, where she sang in Burbank High School's National Championship Show Choir.

Cameron has stated that she is of French descent and speaks some French. She also has Russian, Slovak and Hungarian ancestry. She has said she was bullied throughout her entire school experience, from fifth grade through the end of high school. Regardless of the pressure at school and fitting in, Cameron stayed focused on her dreams of achieving success in entertainment: "I became very passionate about [becoming an actress and singer]. I fully immersed myself". Her father died in 2011 when she was 15. Following his death, Cameron changed her legal name to Dove in honor of her father who called her by that nickname.

Career

2007–2015: Breakthrough with Disney Channel
In 2007, Cameron portrayed the role of Young Cosette in the Bainbridge Performing Arts (BPA) stage production of Les Misérables, and in 2008, she had the lead role of Mary in The Secret Garden, again with BPA. In 2012, Cameron was cast in a Disney Channel comedy series that was to be titled Bits and Pieces in which she would play the role of Alanna. Shortly after filming the pilot, Bits and Pieces was retooled into Liv and Maddie, which saw Cameron starring in the dual lead role of Liv and Maddie Rooney. The pilot episode gained 5.8 million viewers, which was the most-watched in total viewers in 2.5 years since the series Shake It Up! Disney Channel renewed Liv and Maddie for a 13-episode second season slated to premiere in Fall 2014, which was later expanded to 24 episodes.

On August 27, 2013, Cameron released a cover of "On Top of the World" by Imagine Dragons as a promotional single. Her cover peaked on the Billboard Kid Digital Songs chart at 17 and spent three weeks on the chart. On October 15, 2013, "Better In Stereo" was released as a single under Walt Disney Records. "Better In Stereo" made its debut on the Billboard Kid Digital Songs chart at No. 21 before peaking at No. 1, becoming Cameron's first No. 1 hit. In February 2014, Cameron confirmed reports that recording had begun for her debut studio album. Her next single, "Count Me In", was released on June 3, 2014. The song peaked at number one on the Billboard Kids Digital Songs chart. In 2015, Cameron played Liz Larson in her first non-Disney film, Barely Lethal, which was theatrically released by A24 Films.

Cameron starred in the television film Descendants which premiered on July 31, 2015. The film was viewed by 6.6 million people and spawned Cameron's two first Billboard Hot 100 songs, "Rotten to the Core" at number 38 and a solo song, "If Only", at number 94. Other songs from the film featuring Cameron such as "Set It Off" and "Evil Like Me" charted at number 6 and 12 respectively on the Bubbling Under Hot 100 chart. The soundtrack for the movie peaked atop the Billboard 200 chart, becoming the first soundtrack from a Disney Channel Original Movie since High School Musical 2 to do so. As part of the Descendants franchise, Cameron released a cover of the Christina Aguilera's song "Genie in a Bottle". The music video premiered on Disney Channel on March 18, 2016. The single received 22 million views on YouTube in less than a month.

In 2015, Cameron and Ryan McCartan formed a band called The Girl and the Dreamcatcher. On October 2, 2015, they released their first single, "Written in the Stars". The band released their second single, "Glowing in the Dark", on January 29, 2016. The Girl and the Dreamcatcher released their third single, "Someone You Like", on April 8, 2016. They released their fourth single, "Make You Stay", on June 17, 2016. On July 29, 2016, the band released their first EP, Negatives, featuring their singles "Make You Stay" and "Glowing in the Dark" and four new songs. In October 2016, as a result of Cameron's and McCartan's breakup, the musical duo disbanded. On December 22, 2015, Liv and Maddie was renewed for a fourth season, becoming the ninth live-action Disney Channel series in history to achieve this. Cameron began filming the season, renamed to Liv and Maddie: Cali Style in early 2016. It was later announced that this would be the final season of the series. The series finale of Liv and Maddie later aired on March 24, 2017.

2016–2021: Further acting, voice roles and music releases

Cameron played the role of Amber Von Tussle in the NBC live television presentation of Hairspray Live!, which aired on December 7, 2016. Reception was generally positive, and Cameron's performance was praised. Cameron reprised her role as Mal in Descendants 2, the sequel to Descendants, in 2017. The film premiered on July 21, 2017. The Descendants 2 soundtrack debuted at number six on the Billboard 200, with "It's Goin' Down" from the soundtrack debuting at number 81. Cameron then played the role of Sophie in the Hollywood Bowl live production of Mamma Mia!. The production took place from July 28, 2017, to July 30, 2017.

On August 21, 2017, Cameron was cast in the Netflix film Dumplin', alongside Jennifer Aniston. Cameron played Bekah Cotter in the comedy. In November 2017, Cameron signed on to appear in a recurring role in the fifth season of Agents of S.H.I.E.L.D. by Marvel. This role was later revealed to be Ruby, the daughter of General Hale (Catherine Dent). In December 2017, Cameron was cast in an animated Marvel project, Marvel Rising, as the voice of Gwen Stacy / Ghost-Spider. On August 13, 2018, Marvel Rising: Initiation, a series of six shorts, was released on Disney XD. The series focused on Cameron's character as she was on the run after being framed for her best friend's murder. Though her character did not appear in the next Marvel Rising installment, Marvel Rising: Secret Warriors, Cameron did perform the film's theme song, "Born Ready". In 2019, Cameron reprised the role in Marvel Rising: Chasing Ghosts.

On March 21, 2018, she announced that she had signed with Columbia's Disruptor Records label, and that she would begin to release music following the release of Descendants 3. In September 2019, Cameron released two covers on her YouTube channel: "Slow Burn" and "Hymn for the Weekend". It was announced on October 8, 2018, that Cameron will play the role of Cher Horowitz in the stage adaptation of the 1995 film Clueless. In 2019, Cameron starred alongside Renée Fleming in The Light in the Piazza in London. On September 27, 2019, Cameron released her debut double A-side, Bloodshot / Waste. Then on November 1, 2019, she released her followup single, "So Good". Later that month, she collaborated with Privé Revaux on a range of sunglasses. Cameron continued her focus on music by releasing singles "Out of Touch" and "Remember Me", the latter of which features American rapper Bia. On July 24, 2020, she released her next single, "We Belong". This was followed by the release of "LazyBaby" on April 2, 2021. Later that year, Cameron joined the main cast of the Apple TV+ musical series Schmigadoon!, which premiered on July 16, 2021. Also in 2021, Cameron reprised her role as Mal for the animated special Descendants: The Royal Wedding. She has also been cast in the upcoming CW series The Powerpuff Girls as Bubbles, as well as the upcoming film Field Notes on Love alongside Liv and Maddie co-star Jordan Fisher.

2022–present: Celestial Body 
On February 11, 2022, Cameron released her first solo non-soundtrack song "Boyfriend". This song went viral in TikTok, more than 500 000 clips were shot under this sound in TikTok. The song entered the US Billboard Hot 100, chart at number 16, and at number 9 in the UK Singles Chart, and also and was certified platinum by the RIAA. Cameron voiced Ellen Wright, Nate's older teenage sister in the Paramount+ Nicktoon Big Nate, based on the comic strip and book series of the same name, which premiered on February 17. On June 24, Cameron released the song "Breakfast". On August 28, 2022, at the MTV Video Music Awards, she won the award as the Best New Artist and performed at the pre-show with two songs "Boyfriend" and "Breakfast". On October 28, Cameron released the song "Bad Idea". On November 20, she performed for first time on the stage of the American Music Awards with the song "Boyfriend" and received the award New Artist of the Year, Rania Aniftos of Billboard called this performance one of the most solid vocal performances of the 26-year-old singer and placed it on the 4th place of the favorite performances of this ceremony.

Personal life
Cameron has stated that she is bisexual, but in May 2021, said that she feels queer is the most accurate way to describe her sexuality. She also identifies as a feminist. She was in a relationship with her Liv and Maddie co-star Ryan McCartan from August 2013 until 2016. They announced their engagement on April 14, 2016, but the relationship ended in October 2016. From 2017 until 2020 Cameron was in a relationship with Descendants 2 co-star Thomas Doherty.

In May 2022, Cameron spoke about her struggles with depression and dysphoria in an Instagram post.

Filmography

Stage

Discography

 Celestial Body (2023)

Awards and nominations

References

External links

 
 

1996 births
21st-century American actresses
21st-century American women singers
21st-century American singers
Actresses from Seattle
American child actresses
American child singers
American film actresses
American queer actresses
American stage actresses
American television actresses
American voice actresses
American people of Hungarian descent
American people of Russian descent
American people of Slovak descent
American people of French descent
Dance-pop musicians
Daytime Emmy Award winners
Feminist musicians
American LGBT singers
LGBT people from Washington (state)
Living people
Musicians from Bainbridge Island, Washington
Queer feminists
Queer musicians
Queer women
Walt Disney Records artists